KPLK may refer to:

 KPLK (FM), a radio station (88.9 FM) licensed to serve Sedro-Woolley, Washington, United States
 M. Graham Clark Downtown Airport (ICAO code KPLK)